Palaeospheniscus bilocular is a species of fossil penguins in the genus Palaeospheniscus. The species was named after two characteristic humeri (AMNH 3341 and 3346) (Simpson 1946) from the Early Miocene Gaiman Formation which were found near Gaiman in Chubut Province, Argentina. It was the size of a small gentoo penguin.

In 2007, P. biloculata was moved to the genus from Chubutodyptes, the species becoming P. bilocular.

References

Further reading 
 Simpson, George Gaylord (1946): Fossil penguins. Bull. Am. Mus. Nat. Hist. 87: 7-99. PDF fulltext
 Simpson, George Gaylord (1970): Miocene penguins from Victoria, Australia, and Chubut, Argentina. Mem. Nat. Mus. Victoria 31: 17–24.
 Simpson, George Gaylord (1972): Conspectus of Patagonian fossil penguins. American Museum Novitates 2488: 1-37. PDF fulltext

Palaeospheniscus
Extinct penguins
Miocene birds of South America
Friasian
Santacrucian
Colhuehuapian
Neogene Argentina
Fossils of Argentina
Gaiman Formation
Fossil taxa described in 1970
Taxa named by George Gaylord Simpson